Statistics of Czechoslovak First League in the 1955 season.

Overview
It was contested by 12 teams, and Slovan Bratislava won the championship. Emil Pažický was the league's top scorer with nineteen goals.

Stadia and locations

League standings

Results

Top goalscorers

References

Czechoslovakia - List of final tables (RSSSF)

Czechoslovak First League seasons
Czech
Czech
1
1